Barney is a village and former civil parish, now in the parish of Fulmodeston, in the North Norfolk district, in the county of Norfolk, England. The nearest railway station is at Sheringham for the Bittern Line which runs between Sheringham, Cromer and Norwich. The nearest airport is Norwich International Airport. In 1931 the parish had a population of 243.

History 
'Barney' means either 'Bera's island', 'barn island' or perhaps, 'barley island'. On 1 April 1935 the parish was abolished and merged with Fulmodeston.

War Memorial
Barney's War Memorial is a marble plaque located on the outside of the Wesleyan Chapel. It holds the following names for the First World War:
 Sergeant Arthur W. Whitehand (d.1917), Royal Army Service Corps
 Sergeant Robert Harrod (1896-1916), 8th Battalion, Royal Norfolk Regiment
 Private William Horn (d.1916), 6th Battalion, Durham Light Infantry
 Private William Temple (1876-1918), 3rd Battalion, Royal Norfolk Regiment
 Private J. Edward Cowling (1895-1916), 9th Battalion, Royal Norfolk Regiment
 John S. Chapman
 John Jones
 John Temple
 Arthur Tuck

References

External links
 
 

Villages in Norfolk
Former civil parishes in Norfolk
North Norfolk